Sebastián Andrés Lujan (born December 14, 1979) is an Argentine professional boxer and three-time world title challenger.

Pro career
In June 2003, Sebastián Andrés won the WBO Latino Welterweight Championship by beating fellow Argentinian Carlos Adan Jerez, at the time Jerez had a record of 14-1.

WBO Welterweight Championship
On February 18, 2005 Lujan lost to the WBO Welterweight Champion American Antonio Margarito on ESPN.

WBO Light Middleweight Championship
His next title fight ended in a disputed decision loss to the WBO Light Middleweight Champion Sergiy Dzindziruk in Die Kulturhalle, Munich, Bayern, Germany.

On December 3, 2011, Jones defeated Sebastian Andres Lujan by unanimous decision in an IBF Welterweight Title Eliminator. The fight took place at Madison Square Garden on the under card of Miguel Cotto vs Antonio Margarito II.

Outside boxing
His victory over Paolo Roberto is referenced in Stieg Larsson's book The Girl Who Played with Fire. In the book, Roberto gets beaten down by an unusual hulk and during the fight he reminds Lujàn match.

Professional record

|- style="margin:0.5em auto; font-size:95%;"
| style="text-align:center;" colspan="8"|43 Wins (26 Knockouts), 13 Defeats, 2 Draws, 1 No Contest
|-  style="text-align:center; margin:0.5em auto; font-size:95%; background:#e3e3e3;"
|  style="border-style:none none solid solid; "|Res.
|  style="border-style:none none solid solid; "|Record
|  style="border-style:none none solid solid; "|Opponent
|  style="border-style:none none solid solid; "|Type
|  style="border-style:none none solid solid; "|Rd., Time
|  style="border-style:none none solid solid; "|Date
|  style="border-style:none none solid solid; "|Location
|  style="border-style:none none solid solid; "|Notes
|- align=center
|Loss || 43-13-2 ||align=left| Pablo Ezequiel Corzo
||| 5  ||  
|align=left| 
|align=left|
|- align=center
|Loss || 43-12-2 ||align=left| Marcelo Coceres
||| 10  ||  
|align=left| 
|align=left|
|- align=center
|Loss || 43-11-2 ||align=left| Jose Antonio Villalobos
||| 6  ||  
|align=left| 
|align=left|
|- align=center
|Loss || 43-10-2 ||align=left| Hector Saldivia
||| 2  ||  
|align=left| 
|align=left|
|- align=center
|Loss || 43-9-2 ||align=left| Hector Saldivia
||| 10  ||  
|align=left| 
|align=left|
|- align=center
|Win || 43-8-2 ||align=left| Amilcar Edgardo Funes Melian
||| 10  ||  
|align=left| 
|align=left|
|- align=center
|Loss || 42-8-2 ||align=left| Víctor Hugo Velázquez
||| 10  ||  
|align=left| 
|align=left|
|- align=center
|Win || 42-7-2 ||align=left| Carlos Saul Chumbita
| || 2 
|
|align=left|
|align=left|
|- align=center
|Win || 41-7-2 ||align=left| Víctor Hugo Velázquez
| || 10 
|
|align=left|
|align=left|
|- align=center
|Win || 40-7-2 ||align=left| Oscar Fabian Pérez
| || 4 
|
|align=left|  
|align=left|
|- align=center
|Loss || 39-7-2 ||align=left| Chris van Heerden
||| 12  ||  
|align=left| 
|align=left|
|- align=center
|Win || 37-6-2 ||align=left| Jose Maria Pombo
|||||
|align=left|
|align=left|
|- align=center
|Loss || 36-6-2  ||align=left| Mike Jones
||| 12  ||  ||align=left|
|align=left|
|- align=center
|Win || 36-5-2 ||align=left| Mark Jason Melligen
|
|
|
|align=left|
|align=left|
|- align=center
|Win || 35-5-2 || align=left| Jorge Daniel Miranda
||| 12  || 
|align=left|
|align=left|
|- align=center
|Win || 34-5-2 ||align=left| Juan Pablo Lucero
||| 4  ||  ||align=left|
|align=left|
|- align=center
|Win || 33-5-2 ||align=left| Juan Jose Dias
| || 10  ||  ||align=left|
|align=left|
|- align=center
|Win || 32-5-2 ||align=left| Emilio Julio Julio
| || 7  || 
|align=left|
|align=left|
|- align=center
|Win || 31-5-2 ||align=left| Jailer Berrio
| || 5  || 
|align=left|
|align=left|
|- align=center
|Win || 30-5-2 ||align=left| Ignacio Lucero Fraga
| || 6  || 
|align=left|
|align=left|
|- align=center
|Win || 29-5-2 ||align=left| Charlie Navarro
| || 12  || 
|align=left|
|align=left|
|- align=center
|Win || 28-5-2 ||align=left| Jose Luis Castillo
| || 10  || 
|align=left|
|align=left|
|- align=center
|Win || 27-5-2 ||align=left| Juan Mauricio Marino
| || 10  || 
|align=left|
|align=left|
|- align=center
|Win || 26-5-2 ||align=left| Walter Matthysse
| || 5  || 
|align=left|
|align=left|
|- align=center
|Win || 25-5-2 ||align=left| Arnaldo Nery Benitez Rios
| || 10  || 
|align=left|
|align=left|
|- align=center
|Loss || 24-5-2 ||align=left| Jamie Moore
| || 12  || 
|align=left|
|align=left|
|- align=center
|Win || 24-4-2 ||align=left| Roberto Hernan Reuque
| || 9  || 
|align=left|
|align=left|
|- align=center
|Loss || 23-4-2 ||align=left| Serhiy Dzinziruk
| || 12  || 
|align=left|
|align=left|
|- align=center
|Win || 23-3-2 ||align=left| Miguel Angel Morales
| || 1  || 
|align=left|
|align=left|
|- align=center
|Loss || 22-3-2 ||align=left| Marco Antonio Avendano
| || 2  || 
|align=left|
|align=left|
|- align=center
|Win || 22-2-2 ||align=left| Ariel Gabriel Chaves
| || 3  || 
|align=left|
|align=left|
|- align=center
|Draw || 21-2-2 ||align=left| Mihaly Kotai
| || 12  || 
|align=left|
|align=left|
|- align=center
|Win || 21-2-1 ||align=left| Marcelo Alejandro Rodriguez
| || 5  || 
|align=left|
|align=left|
|- align=center
|Loss || 20-2-1 ||align=left|Antonio Margarito
| || 10  || 
|align=left|
|align=left|
|- align=center
|Win || 20-1-1 ||align=left| Cesar Alberto Leiva
| || 1  || 
|align=left|
|align=left|
|- align=center
|Win || 19-1-1 ||align=left| Sergio Gaston Finetto
| || 10  || 
|align=left|
|align=left|
|- align=center
| style="background:#ddd;"||| 18-1-1 ||align=left| Alejandro Jesus Benitez
| || 2  || 
|align=left|
|align=left|
|- align=center
|Win || 18-1-1 ||align=left| Ariel Gerardo Aparicio
| || 1  || 
|align=left|
|align=left|
|- align=center
|Win || 17-1-1 ||align=left| Ariel Sebastian Oscar Villalba
| || 1  || 
|align=left|
|align=left|
|- align=center
|Win || 16-1-1 ||align=left| Sergio Ernesto Acuna
| || 1  || 
|align=left|
|align=left|
|- align=center
|Win || 15-1-1 ||align=left| Ruben Dario Oliva
| || 1  || 
|align=left|
|align=left|
|- align=center
|Win || 14-1-1 ||align=left| Alejandro Jesus Benitez
| || 10  || 
|align=left|
|align=left|
|- align=center
|Win || 13-1-1 ||align=left| Marcos Carlos Alegre
| || 3  || 
|align=left|
|align=left|
|- align=center
|Win || 12-1-1 ||align=left| Paolo Roberto
| || 2  || 
|align=left|
|align=left|
|- align=center
|Win || 11-1-1 ||align=left| Javier Alejandro Blanco
| || 3  || 
|align=left|
|align=left|
|- align=center
|Win || 10-1-1 ||align=left| Carlos Adan Jerez
| || 7  || 
|align=left|
|align=left|
|- align=center

References

External links

Sportspeople from Santa Fe, Argentina
Light-middleweight boxers
Welterweight boxers
1979 births
Living people
Argentine male boxers